Streptomyces scopiformis is a bacterium species from the genus of Streptomyces which has been isolated from soil in China.

See also 
 List of Streptomyces species

References

Further reading

External links
Type strain of Streptomyces scopiformis at BacDive -  the Bacterial Diversity Metadatabase	

scopiformis
Bacteria described in 2002